The Partridge Family Album is the first of eight studio albums by The Partridge Family. The LP was released in October 1970, a month after the debut of the ABC-TV musical sitcom The Partridge Family starring Shirley Jones and featuring David Cassidy, both of whom feature on the album, as do studio backing vocalists and session musicians. The success of the album – which in early January 1971 reached no. 4 on Billboard's Top LP's chart – was bolstered not only by the hit TV show but by the album's one single release, the massive hit "I Think I Love You", which for three weeks in November and December 1970 topped Billboard's Hot 100 and which NARM declared best-selling single of 1970.

The album did not chart in the UK – the TV series did not debut in Great Britain until September 1971 – but reached no. 6 in Canada on the RPM 100 national album chart.

The album was produced by Wes Farrell and engineered by Bob Kovach, with arrangements by Mike Melvoin, Billy Strange, Wes Farrell and Don Peake. As with all of the Partridge Family's studio output, the album features musicians associated with iconic Los Angeles-based session players "the Wrecking Crew":  Dennis Budimir, Louie Shelton, Tommy Tedesco, Joe Osborn, Max Bennett, Larry Knechtel, Mike Melvoin and Hal Blaine.

Members of overlapping studio groups the Ron Hicklin Singers and the Love Generation – brothers John and Tom Bahler (also spelled Bähler), Ron Hicklin and Jackie Ward – feature prominently as backing vocalists throughout the album, as they do on all successive Partridge Family albums. Also, their blended harmonies dominate the album's two tracks that do not include David Cassidy: "I'm on the Road" and "I Really Want to Know You", both written by Barry Mann and Cynthia Weil. And on "To Be Lovers" they perform the verse, with Cassidy singing only the bridge. Originally the Bahler brothers, Hicklin and Ward were solely responsible for the Partridge Family sound. But with the revelation that David Cassidy could sing professionally, Wes Farrell promoted Cassidy to lead singer.

The album features songs by Tony Romeo, Wes Farrell, songwriting partners Terry Cashman and Tommy West, and afore-mentioned songwriting duo Barry Mann and Cynthia Weil.

The album's cover was designed to look like an old-fashioned photo album. The album's back cover features a picture of the whole TV family alongside solo portraits of David Cassidy and Shirley Jones. Certain copies included a label promoting the LP's inclusion of "I Think I Love You"; this was embedded in the front cover artwork (and not on the protective plastic).  The original release of the album included a framed color photograph of the group.

Track listing
All tracks from the album were featured in first-season episodes of the TV show. Curiously, the show's theme song is nowhere to be found on this album or any of the other original albums, only later surfacing on their Greatest Hits album.

Personnel
David Cassidy, Shirley Jones - vocals
Dennis Budimir, Louie Shelton, Tommy Tedesco - guitar
Joe Osborn, Max Bennett - bass
Larry Knechtel, Mike Melvoin - keyboards
Hal Blaine - drums
Jackie Ward - vocals

Recording dates

May 11, 1970
"Somebody Wants To Love You"
"I Think I Love You"

May 16, 1970
"I Really Want to Know You"
"Only a Moment Ago"
"I'm on the Road" (See June 11, 1970)
"Singing My Song" (See June 11, 1970)

June 11, 1970
"I'm on the Road" (Re-Record, see May 16, 1970)
"Singing My Song" (Re-Record, see May 16, 1970)

August 4, 1970
"Point Me in the Direction of Albuquerque"
"I Can Feel Your Heartbeat"
"To Be Lovers"

August 5, 1970
"Brand New Me"
"Bandala"

See recording dates for this and other Partridge Family albums at The Partridge Family Recording Sessions

Charts

References

1970 debut albums
The Partridge Family albums
Albums arranged by Mike Melvoin
Albums arranged by Billy Strange
Albums produced by Wes Farrell
Bell Records albums
Albums recorded at United Western Recorders